The Arpaș is a left tributary of the river Olt in Romania. It discharges into the Olt in Arpașu de Jos. Its source is in the Făgăraș Mountains.

Hydronymy 

The Hungarian name means "barley". The Romanian name derives from that.

References

Rivers of Romania
Rivers of Sibiu County